The Oman Professional League Cup (known as the Mazda Professional Cup for sponsorship reasons), previously known as the  Oman Federation Cup, is an Omani football competition. The first edition was played in 2007 and was known as the Oman FA Cup. The competition was not played again until 2012.

The competition tends to feature all clubs currently playing in the top flight. The Professional League Cup ranks far below the prestigious Sultan Qaboos Cup in terms of domestic competitions.

In 2014, ahead of the 2014-15 Oman Professional League Cup, it was announced by Oman Football Association that Mazda have agreed to sponsor the Professional League Cup and will henceforth be known as the Mazda Professional Cup, for a period of four years. According to a four-year agreement reached by the two parties, Mazda became the title sponsor of the 14-team competition.

Championship History

Year by year

Cities
The following table lists the Omani League champions by cities.

Performance by club

See also

Oman Professional League
Sultan Qaboos Cup
Oman Super Cup

References

 
Football cup competitions in Oman
Cup